Willian Benito Candia Garay (born March 23, 1993) is a Paraguayan professional footballer who plays as midfielder for Club Olimpia.

Career statistics

References

External links
 

1993 births
Living people
Paraguayan footballers
Paraguayan expatriate footballers
Association football midfielders
Cerro Porteño players
Deportivo Capiatá players
Racing Club de Avellaneda footballers
Club Olimpia footballers
River Plate (Asunción) footballers
Paraguayan Primera División players
Paraguayan expatriate sportspeople in Argentina
Expatriate footballers in Argentina